Wei Rugui (1836 – 16 January 1895) was a Han Chinese general of the late Qing dynasty who fought in the First Sino-Japanese War. He took part in the Battle of Pyongyang in 1894, and subsequently lost another couple thousand troops on the retreat north. He later abandoned Port Arthur when it was taken by the advancing Imperial Japanese Army. Wei Rugui was subsequently executed for his failures in January 1895.

Sources

References

Books

1836 births
1895 deaths
Chinese military personnel of the First Sino-Japanese War
Qing dynasty generals
People executed by the Qing dynasty